The Church of the Presidents may refer to:

 United First Parish Church, Quincy, Massachusetts
 Church of the Presidents (New Jersey)
 St. John's Episcopal Church, Lafayette Square